Julia Grout (1898-1984) was the Chairman of the Women's Department of Health and Physical Education at Duke University from 1924 to 1964. She was the first director of the physical education department in Duke Women's college.

Life and career
Julia "Jerry" Grout was born April 1, 1898 in North Brookfield, Massachusetts to Edgar H. Grout and Laura M. Grout. Grout earned an A.B. degree at Wellesley College. She became a physical education director at Duke, in 1924. She held the post until she retired in 1964. She taught for two years at Wellesley College before coming to Duke University.

Grout contributed substantially to the promotion of physical education for women, writing and speaking extensively on the topic. Her work led her to travel extensively to report on physical education programs in Europe and Africa.

Duke University honored Grout in 1982 through the establishment of a biennial lecture in her name, being cited for her leadership in bringing national recognition to her department through the quality of its staff and programs.

Grout died on April 23, 1984 in Chapel Hill, after an extended illness. Duke University's library maintains an archive related to her work and life.

Teaching
In the 1930s, the Women's Physical Education Department at Duke assessed entering students in posture, health status and their development of sports skills.

References

External links
 Guide to the Julia R. Grout Papers, Duke University

1898 births
Mount Holyoke College alumni
1984 deaths
Duke University faculty